The Magnuskerk is a 16th-century church in Bellingwolde, Netherlands. The church, located at Hoofdweg 227, was built in 1527. The pulpit was installed in 1660 and the organ built in 1797. The church has been a national heritage site since 1972. It is currently used by the Protestant Church in the Netherlands.

Gallery

References

External links 

 

1527 establishments in Europe
Bellingwolde
Churches in Groningen (province)
Protestant churches in the Netherlands
Rijksmonuments in Groningen (province)